Ladero may refer to:

 Ladero, Missouri
 Héctor Ladero (born 1989), a Spanish football (soccer) player
 Ladera/ladero, a category of dishes in Ottoman cuisine made with olive oil

See also
 Ladera (disambiguation)